Jörg Wontorra (born 29 November 1948 in Lübeck) is a German television presenter and sports journalist.

Wontorra lives in Marbella, Spain. He has two children, Marcel and Laura.

Awards 
 Bayerischer Fernsehpreis, 2010

Books

References

External links 

German sports journalists
German sports broadcasters
German male journalists
20th-century German journalists
21st-century German journalists
Writers from Lübeck
Living people
1948 births
German male writers
ARD (broadcaster) people
Sat.1 people